Boris Said (May 5, 1932 in New York City – March 24, 2002 in Seattle), better known as Bob Said, was an American racing driver from the United States.

Career
Said was the first American to win a road race in Europe after World War II – the 1953 Rouen Grand Prix. He participated in the first Formula One United States Grand Prix at Sebring on December 12, 1959.  He spun off on the first lap and scored no World Championship points. He also made one NASCAR start, the 1959 Daytona 500 where he finished 50th after a transmission failure.

Said was also a bobsled racer, competing in the Olympics twice, 1968 in Grenoble and in 1972 at Sapporo, Japan achieving a best result of tenth. The 1968 games were notable as he competed against another racing driver-come-bobsledder, Robin Widdows.

Later he was the executive producer of a documentary entitled The Mystery of the Sphinx.

His son, Boris Said III, is a retired NASCAR driver and road course ringer.

Motorsports career results

Complete Formula One results

NASCAR
(key) (Bold – Pole position awarded by qualifying time. Italics – Pole position earned by points standings or practice time. * – Most laps led.)

Grand National Series

References

External links
Bob Said biography at Grandprix.com
Mystery of the Sphynx at IMDB

1932 births
American male bobsledders
American Formula One drivers
Connaught Formula One drivers
American people of Syrian descent
Bobsledders at the 1968 Winter Olympics
Bobsledders at the 1972 Winter Olympics
NASCAR drivers
2002 deaths
Racing drivers from New York City
World Sportscar Championship drivers
Olympic bobsledders of the United States